The Taiwan barwing or Formosan barwing (Actinodura morrisoniana) is a species of bird in the family Leiothrichidae.
It is found in Taiwan.
Its natural habitats are temperate forests and subtropical or tropical moist lowland forests.

References

Collar, N. J. & Robson C. 2007. Family Timaliidae (Babblers)  pp. 70 – 291 in; del Hoyo, J., Elliott, A. & Christie, D.A. eds. Handbook of the Birds of the World, Vol. 12. Picathartes to Tits and Chickadees. Lynx Edicions, Barcelona.

Taiwan barwing
Birds of Taiwan
Endemic birds of Taiwan
Taiwan barwing
Taxonomy articles created by Polbot
Taxobox binomials not recognized by IUCN